Tortoise Beats Hare is a 1941 Merrie Melodies animated short supervised and laid out by Tex Avery (solely supervisal credited as "Fred A-Very," as read by Bugs Bunny). It was released on March 15, 1941. The short, loosely based on Aesop's fable The Tortoise and the Hare, stars Bugs Bunny and, in his first appearance, Cecil Turtle. Bugs "tears up" the title card.

Plot
As the opening credits appear Bugs Bunny comes on the screen eating a carrot and absentmindedly begins reading them, grossly mispronouncing all of them in the process (e.g.  for "Avery" over the correct ), except for the words "story," "animation," the first names of Charles McKimson, Dave Monahan, and Fred Avery, and all of Carl W. Stalling's name. As he finishes, he sees the name of the cartoon and becomes infuriated, spitting out his mouthful of the carrot he was eating. After a brief tirade involving ripping apart the opening credits, he finds Cecil Turtle and bets him ten dollars he can win against him in a race.

Cecil accepts and, after Bugs takes a big lead, hurries to a telephone center, to a phone intended for turtles only, and rings up his cousins on a telephone.  He devises a scheme in which they will double as him at significant points along the track while he himself crosses the finish line ahead of Bugs. The plan works, with Bugs being befuddled at what looks like Cecil always being one step ahead of him. After reaching the finish line, thinking he's won, Bugs finds Cecil waiting for him, the apparent victor. Bugs, both furious and perplexed, pays Cecil his owed ten dollars. As Bugs somberly walks away, he suddenly wonders if he'd been tricked. When he turns around, Cecil's cousins, each with one of the ten dollars in hand, say to him in unison, "Ehhh, it's a possibility," and all of them then kiss Bugs.

See also
 Tortoise Wins by a Hare
 Rabbit Transit

Home media
DVD - Looney Tunes Golden Collection: Volume 2, Disc One
Blu-ray/DVD - Looney Tunes Platinum Collection: Volume 2, Disc Two

References

External links
 
 

1941 films
1941 short films
1941 animated films
Films directed by Tex Avery
American track and field films
Merrie Melodies short films
Self-reflexive films
Films based on the Tortoise and the Hare
Films scored by Carl Stalling
Bugs Bunny films
Films produced by Leon Schlesinger
1940s Warner Bros. animated short films